A History of British Art is a 1996 BBC six-part television documentary series tracing the history of British art from 1066 to the modern day. Written and presented by Andrew Graham-Dixon, it was originally aired on BBC2 and later repeated on BBC Four in 2008.

References

External links
 
 

1996 British television series debuts
1996 British television series endings
1990s British documentary television series
Television series about art
BBC television documentaries
1066 in England
1066 in Europe
English-language television shows